William Vaughn Moody (July 8, 1869 – October 17, 1910) was an American dramatist and poet. Moody was author of The Great Divide, first presented under the title of The Sabine Woman at the Garrick Theatre in Chicago on April 12, 1906. His poetic dramas are The Masque of Judgment (1900), The Fire Bringer (1904), and The Death of Eve (left undone at his death).  His best-known poem is "An Ode In Time Of Hesitation," on the Spanish-American War; others include "Gloucester Moor," "On A Soldier Fallen In The Philippines," "The Brute," "Harmonics" (his only sonnet), "Until the Troubling of the Waters," "The Departure," "How The Mead-Slave Was Set Free," "The Daguerreotype," and "The Death of Eve."  His poems everywhere bespeak the social conscience of the progressive era (1893-1916) in which he spent his foreshortened life.  In style they evoke a mastery of the verse-craft of his time and also the reach and depth derived from his intensive studies of Milton and of Greek Tragedy.

Biography
Born at Spencer, Indiana, his parents died while he was a boy, and he had to work to help support himself while he completed his education. After attending New Albany High School he went on to Harvard University, where he was awarded the George B. Sohier Prize for literature and earned an A.B. in 1893 and an A.M. in 1894.

He taught English at Harvard and Radcliffe until 1895, when he became first an instructor at the University of Chicago and then, from 1901 to 1907, assistant professor of English and rhetoric there.  He received the degree of Litt.D. from Yale in 1908, and was a member of the American Academy of Arts and Letters.  Among his close friends were the historian Ferdinand Schevill, the editor Norman Hapgood, the author, academic, activist and diplomat Robert Morss Lovett, and the poet Trumbull Stickney.  After a time he resigned his teaching post at the University of Chicago, commenting (as his friend John Matthews Manly quotes him in the introduction to the posthumous collection of his works),  "I cannot do it; I feel that at every lecture I slay a poet."

Moody died from brain cancer at Colorado Springs at the age of 41.

Works

 The Complete Poetical Works of John Milton (editor; 1899, Cambridge)
 The Masque of Judgment (1900)
 Poems (1901)
 The Fire-Bringer (1904, intended as the first member of a trilogy on the Promethean theme, of which The Masque of Judgment, already published, was the second member)
 The Great Divide (1907), prose drama, especially successful on the stage.
 The Faith Healer (1909), prose drama, very successful on the stage
 A First View of English and American Literature (compiler with Robert M. Lovett; 1902)
 The Poems of Trumbull Stickney (editor with George Cabot Lodge and John Ellerton Lodge; 1905)
His complete works, including The Death of Eve, a fragment of the third member of the proposed trilogy mentioned above, were edited with an introduction by John M. Manly (1912).

See also
The Harvard Monthly

Notes

References

 This work in turn cites:
 Daniel Gregory Mason, Some Letters of William Vaughn Moody (1913)

External links

 Biography at poemhunter.com
 TheatreHistory.com profile
 
 
 
 Works by William Vaughn Moody, at Hathi Trust
Finding aid to Wallace Ludwig Anderson letters on William Vaughn Moody at Columbia University. Rare Book & Manuscript Library.
Guide to the William Vaughn Moody Papers 1892-1925 at the University of Chicago Special Collections Research Center

1869 births
1910 deaths
20th-century American dramatists and playwrights
American male poets
Deaths from brain cancer in the United States
Neurological disease deaths in Colorado
Deaths from cancer in Colorado
Harvard University alumni
Harvard University faculty
Members of the American Academy of Arts and Letters
People from New Albany, Indiana
University of Chicago faculty
Yale University alumni
People from Spencer, Indiana
American male dramatists and playwrights
20th-century American male writers